The Golden Reel Award for Outstanding Achievement in Sound Editing - Dialogue and ADR for Episodic Short Form Broadcast Media is an annual award given by the Motion Picture Sound Editors in the United States. It honors sound editors whose work has warranted merit in the field of television; in this case, their work in the field of sound effects and foley work in short form broadcast media. The "short form" of the title refers to television episodes that have a runtime of less than one hour, though more than 35 minutes, as those episodes now have their own category. It was first awarded in 1998, for episodes premiering the previous year, under the title Best Sound Editing - Television Episodic - Effects & Foley. The term "short form" was added to the category in 2005, though long form television had had its own category by then. The award has been given with its current title since 2018.

Winners and nominees

1990s
Best Sound Editing - Television Episodic - Effects & Foley

2000s

Best Sound Editing in Television - Effects & Foley, Episodic

Best Sound Editing in Television Episodic - Sound Effects & Foley

Best Sound Editing in Television Short Form - Sound Effects & Foley

Best Sound Editing in Sound Effects and Foley for Television - Short Form

Best Sound Editing - Sound Effects and Foley for Short Form Television

Best Sound Editing - Short Form Sound Effects and Foley in Television

2010s

Outstanding Achievement in Sound Editing - Sound Effects and Foley for Episodic Short Form Broadcast Media

2020s

Programs with multiple awards

4 awards
 Game of Thrones (HBO)

3 awards
 ER (NBC)
 Lost (ABC)

2 awards
 CSI: Crime Scene Investigation (CBS)
 The Mandalorian (Disney+)
|}

Programs with multiple nominations

9 nominations
 CSI: Crime Scene Investigation
 ER (NBC)

8 nominations
 Smallville (The WB/CW)

7 nominations
 Game of Thrones (HBO)

6 nominations
 CSI: Miami (CBS)
 Third Watch (NBC)
 Vikings (History)

5 nominations
 Lost (ABC)
 The X-Files (Fox)

4 nominations
 CSI: NY (CBS)
 Supernatural (The WB/CW)
 The Walking Dead (AMC)

3 nominations
 Battlestar Galactica (Sci Fi)
 Breaking Bad (AMC)
 The Borgias (Showtime)
 House (Fox)

2 nominations
 The 100 (The CW)
 Alias (ABC)
 American Horror Story (FX)
 Better Call Saul (AMC)
 Buffy the Vampire Slayer (The WB)
 Eureka (Sci Fi)
 Fargo (FX)
 Fringe (Fox)
 Hanna (Amazon)
 Hercules: The Legendary Journeys (Syndicated)
 Homeland (Showtime)
 The Mandalorian (Disney+)
 Marco Polo (Netflix)
 Millennium (Fox)
 Mr. Robot (USA)
 Nash Bridges (CBS)
 The Pretender (NBC)
 Stranger Things (Netflix)
 The Terror' (AMC)
 Tom Clancy's Jack Ryan (Amazon)
 True Detective (HBO)

References

American television awards
Film sound production
Golden Reel Awards (Motion Picture Sound Editors)